Karl Fredericks (born July 15, 1990) is an American professional wrestler signed with WWE, where he performs on NXT under the ring name Eddy Thorpe. He is also known for his stint in New Japan Pro-Wrestling (NJPW), where he was the winner of the 2019 Young Lion Cup.

Professional wrestling career

New Japan Pro-Wrestling (2018–2022)
In 2018, Fredericks entered New Japan Pro-Wrestling LA Dojo, along with Clark Connors and Alex Coughlin. He visited Japan for the first time as a representative of the LA Dojo at the Young Lion Cup held in September 2019 and won the tournament with 12 points. Fredericks teamed with Hirooki Goto for the World Tag League in the same year, finishing with 3 wins and 12 losses.

In August 2020, Fredericks competed in the inaugural New Japan Cup USA tournament, with the winner receiving a match for the IWGP United States Championship. He lost to Kenta in the first round. From this time on, he changed the colors of his shorts from black to red. At the main event of "Ignition" on June 25, 2021, Fredericks challenged Tom Lawlor for the Strong Openweight Championship and lost. On August 1, 2022, Fredericks' contract with New Japan expired and he announced he would not renew it.

WWE (2023–present)
In January 2023, it was reported he signed a contract with WWE. In February, he was assigned the ring name Eddy Thorpe.

Personal life
Fredericks is a Native American and his WWE ring name is a reference to athlete Jim Thorpe.

Championships and accomplishments
All Pro Wrestling
APW Worldwide Internet Championship (1 time)
APW Tag Team Championship (1 time) - with Styker
New Japan Pro-Wrestling
Young Lion Cup (2019)
Pro Championship Wrestling
PCW Inter-California Championship (1 time)
 Pro Wrestling Illustrated
 Ranked No. 287 of the top 500 singles wrestlers in the PWI 500 in 2021

References

External links 

Karl Fredericks' Japanese New Japan Pro-Wrestling profile
 

1990 births
Living people
People from Reno, Nevada
American male professional wrestlers
Native American professional wrestlers
Professional wrestlers from Nevada
Expatriate professional wrestlers in Japan
American expatriate sportspeople in Japan
20th-century American people
21st-century American people